Entente cordiale is a 1939 French drama film directed by Marcel L'Herbier and starring Gaby Morlay, Victor Francen and Pierre Richard-Willm. The film depicts events between the Fashoda crisis in 1898 and the 1904 signing of the Entente Cordiale creating an alliance between Britain and France and ending their historic rivalry. It was based on the book King Edward VII and His Times by André Maurois. It was made with an eye to its propaganda value, following the Munich Agreement of September 1938 and in anticipation of the outbreak of a Second World War which would test the bonds between Britain and France in a conflict with Nazi Germany.

Cast
 Gaby Morlay ... La reine Victoria
 Victor Francen ... Édouard VII
 Pierre Richard-Willm ... Capitaine Charles Roussel
 André Lefaur ... Lord Clayton
 Arlette Marchal ... La reine Alexandra
 Junie Astor ... Une actrice / An actress
 Nita Raya ... Music Hall Star
 Dorville ... Le cocher / Coachman
 Carine Nelson ... Marjorie, une dame d'honneur
 Jean Périer ... Président Loubet
 Marcelle Praince ... Lady Clayton
 Jacques Baumer ... Clémenceau
 Jacques Grétillat ... Député Roussel
 Bernard Lancret ... Jean Roussel
 Janine Darcey ... Sylvia Clayton
 Jean Worms ... Théophile Delcassé
 Jaque Catelain ... Le prince consort
 Jean Toulout ... Lord Salisbury
 André Roanne ... Arthur Balfour
 Jean d'Yd ... Joë Chamberlain
 Louis Seigner ... L'ambassadeur d'Allemagne
 Robert Pizani ... Paul Cambon
 Aimé Clariond ... L'ambassadeur de Russie
 Abel Tarride ... La maître d'hôtel
 Sinoël ... Le concierge
 Pierre Labry ... Un journaliste / A journalist
 Jean Galland ... Général Kitchener
 Liliane Lesaffre ... La fille du concierge
 Suzanne Devoyod ... Une dame d'honneur
 Ginette Gaubert ... Jeanne Granier
 Gabrielle Fontan ... Une dame de la Cour
 Génia Vaury ... Mme de Lormes
 Christiane Ribes ... Mme de Vaumoise

Production
Entente Cordiale was the third in Marcel L'Herbier's series of "Chroniques filmées" (following La Tragédie impériale and Adrienne Lecouvreur, both in 1938) in which he dramatised historical subjects in a manner "very close to reality", albeit reluctantly combined with some romantic fiction.

Filming took place at the Studios de Saint-Maurice (south-east of Paris) in January & February 1939, and it was ready for its gala première in April before representatives of the French and British governments.

References

External links

1939 films
French historical films
1930s historical films
Films set in 1904
Films directed by Marcel L'Herbier
French black-and-white films
Cultural depictions of Herbert Kitchener, 1st Earl Kitchener
Cultural depictions of Queen Victoria on film
1930s French films